The following elections occurred in the year 1820.
 1820 French legislative election
 Spanish general election, 1820
 1820 United Kingdom general election

North America

United States
 1820 Missouri gubernatorial election
 1820 New York gubernatorial election
 1820 and 1821 United States House of Representatives elections
 1820 United States presidential election
 United States Senate election in New York, 1819/1820
 1820 and 1821 United States Senate elections

See also
 :Category:1820 elections

1820
Elections